Meire is a surname. Notable people with the surname include:

Claudine Meire (born 1947), French sprinter
Katrien Meire (born 1984), Belgian lawyer
Stephanie Meire (born 1971), Belgian beauty pageant winner

See also
Leire (given name)